Jan Karlsson may refer to:
Jan O. Karlsson (1939–2016), Swedish politician
Jan Karlsson (cyclist) (born 1966), Swedish Olympic cyclist
Jan Karlsson (footballer) (born 1940), Swedish footballer that has played for Djurgården
Jan Karlsson (wrestler) (born 1945), Swedish Olympic wrestler
Jan Karlsson (swimmer), Swedish swimmer in 1991 European Sprint Swimming Championships

See also
Janne Karlsson (disambiguation)
Jan Carlzon (born 1941), Swedish businessman